World Salsa Championships are major international salsa dancing competitions held throughout the world. There are several competitions around the world that claim to be "World Championships" of salsa.

Mayan World Salsa Championships 

The oldest international salsa competition is the "Mayan World Salsa Championships", hosted by Club Mayan in LA. Publishing video-clips on this site did much to publicize salsa, especially LA-style salsa. For many years Johnny Vazquez dominated this competition before relocating to teach throughout Europe.

WSF World Salsa Championships 

The WSF World Salsa Championships are organized by Isaac and Laura Altman, who formed the World Salsa Federation (WSF) in 2001. The competition is held every year in Miami, with the first competition held in 2002. The competition features 13 different divisions including solo, couple, and team competitions, and there are separate age divisions for Adults (18+), Youths (ages 13–17) and Juniors (ages 12 and under).

The WSF is recognized by the Amateur Athletic Union, the largest amateur sporting organization in the U.S. with over 800,000 members, as a governing body for salsa dancing and competition in the US.  Isaac and Laura were successful in bringing Salsa and DanceSport as official sports in the AAU Junior Olympic Games in 2002 and Isaac became its National Director.

World Salsa Open 

The World Salsa Open is an international salsa competition held every year at the Puerto Rico Salsa Congress. The first competition was held in 2002, and the competition draws a large attendance of competitors from South America.

World Salsa Championships 

2005 saw the birth of an alternative "World Salsa Championships", created by Salsa promoter Albert Torres and a group of other promoters called the "Salsa Seven", and broadcast live on ESPN. Competitions were held in four categories: "On 1", "On 2", "Cabaret" and "Groups", such as "Rueda de Casino", a variation on Cuban style.

The 2008 competition was cancelled due to the 2008 Global financial crisis, and the last World Salsa Championships were held in 2009 and the competition ceased operations due to financial troubles and a falling out among the event organizers. However, the World Salsa Championships was re-launched successfully under new ownership (World Dance Group) in 2016 from December 9-10 in Atlanta, Georgia. As in previous years the event was broadcast on ESPN network. The event takes place every four years following the olympic format. The next edition of the World Salsa Championships will take place in 2020.

World Latin Dance Cup 

In 2010, the salsa promoter Albert Torres started a new salsa competition called "The World Latin Dance Cup" (WLDC), which included other Latin dances besides salsa, such as Cha Cha Cha, Bachata, and Cumbia and divisions for amateur competitors, youths, and seniors. One of the biggest latin dance competitions in the world.

The first annual WLDC was held in San Diego, with the second competition held in Las Vegas.  In 2012 the competition was moved to Miami. In 2016 the competition was moved to Orlando. In 2019 the competition was moved to Medellin, Colombia. The competition moved to an online-only format in 2021 due to the Covid-19 pandemic. The 2023 World Latin Dance Cup have been announced.

World Salsa Summit 

The World Salsa Summit is a global salsa competition first held on January, 31st 2013 - February 3rd, 2013.  The competition is organized by Katie Marlow (multiple world title holder in dance, choreographer, producer, and performer), Nelson Flores, and Billy Fajardo (former head judge of the World Latin Dance Cup) and is held at the DoubleTree Miami Airport with over 50 different divisions.

Notes 

Salsa
Latin dance competitions
Salsa